EWF may refer to:

 Earth, Wind & Fire, an American funk band
 Education World Forum, an international education seminar
 Empire Wrestling Federation, an American wrestling promotion
 Engineers Without Frontiers
 Enhanced Write Filter, a component of some of Microsoft's embedded operating systems
 Ethiopian World Federation
 European Weightlifting Federation
 European Federation for Welding, Joining and Cutting, a trade organization
 Every Woman Foundation